Nicholas Francis Phelan (19 September 1893 – 14 December 1942) was an Irish Labour Party politician. In 1918 Phelan was a organizer for the Irish Transport and General Workers' Union (ITGWU). The union successfully campaigned for wage increases and against the use of non union labour. 

He was elected to Dáil Éireann as a Labour Party Teachta Dála (TD) for the Waterford–Tipperary East constituency at the 1922 general election. He did not contest the 1923 general election.

References

1893 births
1942 deaths
Labour Party (Ireland) TDs
Members of the 3rd Dáil